Eugene Tyler was a Negro league outfielder between 1939 and 1943.

Tyler made his Negro leagues debut in 1939 with the Cleveland Bears. He went on to play for the Cincinnati/Cleveland Buckeyes in 1942, and finished his career with the Kansas City Monarchs the following season.

References

External links
 and Seamheads

Place of birth missing
Place of death missing
Year of birth missing
Year of death missing
Cincinnati/Cleveland Buckeyes players
Cleveland Bears players
Kansas City Monarchs players
Baseball outfielders